Grigoriy Semyonovich Chernish (born 12 June 1942 in the village Frontivka, Orativ Raion, Vinnytsia Oblast, Ukraine.) was a candidate in the 2004 Ukrainian presidential election, nominated by the Party of Rehabilitation of Infirm People, which he has chaired since 1994. In 1992, he founded an international charity named the "Worldwide aid organization for infirm people" and the medical diagnostic concern "Aesculapius", which he chairs. In 1994, he was elected an Active member (academician) of Russian Federation Academy of Medical Technical Sciences for alternative methods of medical treatment. 
In 1995, he was elected an Academician of Social Sciences of the Russian Federation for new forms of market relationships between commercial organizations (Charity).

References

Living people
Candidates in the 2004 Ukrainian presidential election
Year of birth missing (living people)